Leo V or Levon V (occasionally Levon VI; , Levon V; 1342 – 29 November 1393), of the House of Lusignan, was the last Latin king of the Armenian Kingdom of Cilicia. He ruled from 1374 to 1375.

Leo was described as "Leo V, King of Armenia" on his own personal seal, and as "Leo of Lusignan the Fifth" in the Middle French inscription on his cenotaph: .

Life in Europe

Leon de Lusignan arrived ill and poor to Medina del Campo.
In 1382 or 1383, the King of Castile named Leon Lord of Madrid. John I granted him for life the town of Madrid, Andújar, Guadalajara and Villareal (today Ciudad Real) and a yearly gift of 150,000 maravedis. Leon rebuilt the towers of the Royal Alcázar.

According to father Juan de Mariana, Leon left Castile for France after the death of his protector in 1390. Federico Bravo, however, states that he left after two years of ruling, and five years later, the Madrilenians were conceded the revocation of the lordship by John.
Leon V apparently went to Paris in June 1384, and received the Saint-Ouen castle and a sizable pension from King Charles VI of France. He attempted to reconcile the French and the English (at the time fighting the Hundred Years' War) in order to set up a new Crusade and obtain help to recover his lands, but the meeting he organized in 1386 between Boulogne and Calais were unsuccessful. Leon continued his diplomatic mission to England in 1389 and in 1392.

Death

Leon V never recovered his throne, and died in Paris on November 29, 1393. His remains were laid to rest in the Couvent des Célestins, the second most important burial site for royalty after Saint-Denis, located near what is now the Place de la Bastille in Paris. The prestigious convent was located nearby Leon's residence of Hôtel des Tournelles, itself near Hôtel Saint-Pol, the favourite residence of Charles V and Charles VI in the area of Le Marais.

Leon received lavish funerals and had a lavish tomb, located in the choir of the church. However, the convent was profanated during the French Revolution. After the revolution, his tombstone was recovered by Alexandre Lenoir who placed it in his Musée des monuments Français in the Saint-Denis Basilica. In 1815, during the Restoration, a new cenotaph was established for Leon V at the royal Saint Denis Basilica where most representatives of the French monarchy lie.

The effigy on the tombstone, by an anonymous artist, is of a high realism and quality, and it is thought that it was made while Leon was still alive. Leon V is depicted holding a scepter (now broken) and gloves, symbol of great princes.
The tombstone bears the following inscription in Old French:

English translation:

He had one legitimate daughter, Marie de Lusignan (ca 1370 – Cairo, before July 4, 1381, who predeceased her mother and father), and two illegitimate sons, Guy de Lusignan or Guido de Armenia (died 1405), a Canon in Autun, Bayeux, Paris and Arras and Captain de la Tour d'Amblay, and Stephan or Etienne de Lusignan, a Knight in Sis.

Upon his death the title of King of Armenia was claimed by Leo's distant cousin James I.

See also
Armenia-France relations

Notes

References

Claude Mutafian, Leon V of Lusignan, last king of Armenia (PDF) 
Pierre-Yves Le Pogam, Tomb of Leon V de Lusignan (PDF)

External links
Hommage to Leon V of Lusignan, by Claude Mutafian, Pierre Yves Le Pogam

|-

House of Poitiers-Lusignan
1342 births
1393 deaths
Roman Catholic monarchs
Kings of the Armenian Kingdom of Cilicia
History of Madrid